Herman of Nassau,  (died 16 July before 1206), was count of Nassau. He later became a clergyman.

Life 

Herman was the son of count Rupert III ‘the Bellicose’ of Nassau and Elizabeth of Leiningen.

Herman is mentioned as count of Nassau between 1190 and 1192. He ruled together with count Walram I of Nassau, his father's cousin.

In 1192 Herman became canon of the Saint Peter at Mainz. He probably wasn't married and died without offspring.

Sources 
 This article is translated from the corresponding Dutch Wikipedia article, as of 2018-08-27.

References

External links 
 Family tree of the House of Nassau
 Nassau in: Medieval Lands. A prosopography of medieval European noble and royal families

Counts of Nassau
12th-century people of the Holy Roman Empire
13th-century people of the Holy Roman Empire
Year of birth unknown
Year of death unknown